Somatochlora viridiaenea is a species of dragonfly in the family Corduliidae. The species was described in 1858 by American entomologist Philip Reese Uhler based on a female specimen from Hokkaido, Japan. It has also been recorded on Honshu and in eastern Russia.

References

Corduliidae
Taxa named by Philip Reese Uhler
Insects described in 1858